Beglovo is a rural locality (a village) in Novlenskoye Rural Settlement, Vologodsky District, Vologda Oblast, Russia. The population was 10 as of 2002.

Geography 
Beglovo is located 87 km northwest of Vologda (the district's administrative centre) by road. Yarunovo is the nearest rural locality.

References 

Rural localities in Vologodsky District